Sara Shakeel is a contemporary Pakistani artist known for using glitter and Swarovski crystals to create both digital and physical collages on photography and three-dimensional objects.

Early life and education 
Shakeel taught herself Photoshop and used her artwork as a creative outlet for her emotions.

Artistic career 
Shakeel first gained fame through the social media platform Instagram where she has over one million followers. In the fall of 2019, Shakeel released a capsule clothing collection in collaboration with the London-based retailer Browns as well as displaying her piece The Great Supper in their store.

Glitter Stretch Marks 
In her first body of work posted under the hashtag #glitterstretchmarks, Shakeel superimposed gold glitter, crystals, and galaxies onto images of stretch marks. By covering these stretch marks in glitter and crystals, Shakeel was promoting body positivity and empowerment; taking something often seen as imperfections on a woman's body and turning it into art. In 2019, Shakeel  collaborated with Reebok to create an ad for their body image awareness campaign in which she covered the muscles of athlete Jamie Green with Swarovski crystals in order to spread the message that women's bodies are strong and beautiful.

Work with Chance the Rapper 
Shakeel created the cover art for Chance the Rapper's album The Big Day. For this piece, Shakeel created a physical CD from glass and resin, then covered it in crystals. The object was then photographed and used for the cover art and promotion. Along with the album art, Chance the Rapper commissioned Shakeel to create work for a pop-up exhibition and retail experience coinciding with his record release titled "The Big Store". In this pop-up, each room draws influence from the rapper's life experiences such as his childhood and his wedding day. Much of the artwork in this exhibition was created by Shakeel, who used thousands of Swarovski crystals to completely cover tables, chairs, dinnerware, microphone stands, toys, and more.

The Great Supper 
In 2019, Shakeel created the installation sculpture The Great Supper for an exhibition at NOW Gallery in London. In this piece she was inspired by DaVinci's painting of the last supper and her own memories of eating around the dinner table with her family. She references the importance of the Urdu word gupshup, loosely translated to mean socially-bonding and important chat. Shakeel received the annual Young Artist's Commission from the NOW Gallery for this piece in 2019.

Response to Coronavirus 
Shakeel created a series of images related to hand washing in response to the 2019–20 outbreak of coronavirus, also known as COVID-19. In these images, the water coming from the spout is collaged with crystals and glitter in an attempt to bring a positive impact on people's lives during a difficult time. Shakeel's glittery hand washing images have been used in several blogs and news outlets, including Elle Canada, detailing the best practices for hand washing to prevent the spread of the virus. She also created a series of images featuring health care workers surrounded by glitter and crystals. The original images were sent in via submission to Shakeel and she collaged them to spread joy and positivity.

References

External links 
 Sara Shakeel Artist Website
 Sara Shakeel Instagram
 The Great Supper

Living people
Year of birth missing (living people)
Album-cover and concert-poster artists
Pakistani artists
21st-century Pakistani artists
Instagram accounts
Pakistani women artists
Digital artists
Pakistani contemporary artists